Bruce McLeod may refer to:

Bruce McLeod (clergyman) (born 1930), Moderator of the United Church of Canada
Bruce McLeod (politician) (1890–1966), member of the New Zealand Legislative Council
Bruce McLeod (rugby union) (1940–1996), New Zealand rugby union player